John Chandik is a Canadian retired ice hockey goaltender who was an All-American for Michigan State.

Career
Chandik was a three-year varsity player for Michigan State in the early 1960s. In 1962 the Spartans did not play particularly well, finishing with a middling record, but were able to make their conference tournament. One of the main reasons for the minor success was the play of Chandik, and he was honored by being named an All-American for the year. Michigan State and Chandik could not sustain the level of play and the team finished 6th out of 7th schools for his senior season. Chandik played a bit longer, appearing in the mid-60's for the Fox Valley Astros in their only season of existence. Even after retiring as a player he continued with the game, serving as head coach for the Milwaukee Admirals for two seasons just prior to the team joining the USHL.

Statistics

Regular season and playoffs

Awards and honors

References

External links

Living people
Ice hockey people from Ontario
People from Port Colborne
Canadian ice hockey goaltenders
Michigan State Spartans men's ice hockey players
AHCA Division I men's ice hockey All-Americans
1937 births